Leucadendron osbornei, the Laingsburg conebush, is a flower-bearing shrub belonging to the genus Leucadendron and forms part of the fynbos. The plant was discovered by David Osborne and is native to the Western Cape, South Africa.

Description
The plant dies in a fire but the seeds survive. The seeds are stored in a toll on the female plant and fall to the ground after a fire where they are spread by the wind; the seeds have small wings. The plant is unisexual and there are separate plants with male and female flowers, which are pollinated by small beetles.

Distribution and habitat
The plant is found on the Elandsberg, Anysberg, Touwsberg, and Matjiesgoedberg in the Klein Karoo.

References

osbornei
Taxa named by John Patrick Rourke
Plants described in 1997